1997 Bellmare Hiratsuka season

Competitions

Domestic results

J.League

Emperor's Cup

J.League Cup

Player statistics

 † player(s) joined the team after the opening of this season.

Transfers

In:

Out:

Transfers during the season

In
Satoshi Tsunami (from Avispa Fukuoka)
Hong Myung-bo (from Pohang Steelers on May)

Out
Koji Noguchi (to Kawasaki Frontale)

Awards
J.League Best XI: Hidetoshi Nakata

References
J.LEAGUE OFFICIAL GUIDE 1997, 1997 
J.LEAGUE OFFICIAL GUIDE 1998, 1996 
J.LEAGUE YEARBOOK 1999, 1999

Other pages
 J. League official site
 Shonan Bellmare official website

Bellmare Hiratsuka
Shonan Bellmare seasons